Christopher "Christy" Walsh (1920 – 1 December 1985) was an Irish basketball player. He competed in the men's tournament at the 1948 Summer Olympics.

References

External links
 

1920 births
1985 deaths
Irish men's basketball players
Olympic basketball players of Ireland
Basketball players at the 1948 Summer Olympics
Place of birth missing
Sportspeople from County Kerry
People from Tralee